Young Lover or Young Lovers may refer to:

Film and television
The Young Lovers (1949 film), American drama about dancer afflicted with polio
The Young Lovers (1954 film), British Cold War drama
"Young Lovers", March 29, 1957 episode of American program, The Big Story (radio and TV series)
"The Young Lovers", October 14, 1961 episode of American program, The Defenders (1961 TV series)
The Young Lovers (1964 film), American romantic drama
Young Lovers, Hong Kong-based Shaw Brothers 1966 film; starring Angela Yu Chien
The Young Lovers, Hong Kong-based Kam Kwok/Chi Leun 1967 film; starring Connie Chan
Young Lovers, Hong Kong-based Shaw Brothers/Celestial Pictures 1970 film; written and directed by Umetsugu Inoue
Young Lovers, Tagalog-language 1971 film; starring Vilma Santos
Young Lovers, Taiwan-based 1978 film; starring Charlie Chin
Young Lovers, Hong Kong-based Shaw Brothers 1979 film; starring Derek Yee
Young Lovers, 1979 Egyptian film, directed by Henry Barakat
Young Lovers, 2001 Argentine telenovela, see List of Argentine telenovelas
The Young Lovers, 2022 Franco-Belgian film; starring Fanny Ardant

Music
"Young Lovers" (song), a 1963 song performed by Paul & Paula
"Young Lover", song by Richard Kerr (songwriter)
"Young Lover", song by Gino Vannelli from Juno Awards of 1987

Other uses
The Young Lovers (sculpture), an outdoor work by Georg Ehrlich in London, UK

See also
Hello Young Lovers (disambiguation)